Bata Airport  is an airport serving Bata in Litoral, Equatorial Guinea. It is the second largest airport in Equatorial Guinea after Malabo International Airport.

Overview

It has a 3310-metre runway that operates only during the daytime and in good light. The state carrier and four other private companies make up the majority of Bata's industry, transporting passengers from Bioko's Malabo International Airport or the airports at Annobón or Mongomo. The airport is large enough to accommodate a Boeing 737. Despite that, with the long runway, large twinjets such as the Airbus A350 and the Boeing 787 can take-off and land here, as seen when Vietnam Airlines uses an A350-900 to bring stranded Vietnamese citizen home. Bata served 15,000 passengers in 2001.

In July 2002, all staff at the airport were arrested for allowing the leader of the Popular Union, an opposition party, to board a flight to Gabon.

Airlines and destinations

See also

 List of airports in Equatorial Guinea
 Transport in Equatorial Guinea

References

External links 
 State Opening

Buildings and structures in Bata, Equatorial Guinea
Litoral (Equatorial Guinea)
Airports in Equatorial Guinea